The enzyme 2-oxopent-4-enoate hydratase catalyzes the chemical reaction

4-hydroxy-2-oxopentanoate  2-oxopent-4-enoate + H2O

This enzyme belongs to the family of lyases, specifically the hydro-lyases, which cleave carbon-oxygen bonds.  The systematic name of this enzyme class is 4-hydroxy-2-oxopentanoate hydro-lyase (2-oxopent-4-enoate-forming). Other names in common use include 2-keto-4-pentenoate hydratase, OEH, 2-keto-4-pentenoate (vinylpyruvate)hydratase, and 4-hydroxy-2-oxopentanoate hydro-lyase.  This enzyme participates in nine metabolic pathways: phenylalanine metabolism, benzoate degradation via hydroxylation, biphenyl degradation, toluene and xylene degradation, 1,4-dichlorobenzene degradation, fluorene degradation, carbazole degradation, ethylbenzene degradation, and styrene degradation.

References

 

EC 4.2.1
Enzymes of unknown structure